Kjetil Jansrud (born 28 August 1985) is a Norwegian former World Cup alpine ski racer and Olympic champion. He competed in all alpine disciplines apart from slalom, and his best event was the giant slalom where he has six World Cup podiums and an Olympic silver medal. Since 2012, he had concentrated on the speed events, where all but two of his World Cup victories had come.  At the 2014 Winter Olympics in Sochi, he won the super-G and placed third in the downhill. At the World Championships in 2019 at Åre, Jansrud won gold in the downhill.

Born in Stavanger, Jansrud hails from Vinstra in Gudbrandsdalen, about

Career
At the 2006 Winter Olympics in Turin, Jansrud finished tenth in the combined. He broke his thumb in the Olympic giant slalom which ended his 2006 season. A bulging disc discovered that September kept him out of the entire 2007 season. Jansrud made his first World Cup podium in January 2009 at Adelboden and finished ninth in the super combined in February at the World Championships.

He won the silver medal in giant slalom at the 2010 Winter Olympics at Whistler.

Jansrud won his first World Cup race in March 2012 on home snow at Kvitfjell; he made the podium in all three speed events over the weekend, capped off with a victory in the super-G on Sunday.

At the first men's race of the World Championships in 2013 at Schladming, Jansrud crashed in the super-G, but got up and skied down to the finish. It was later revealed that he tore a ligament in his left knee, ending his 2013 season.

At the Winter Olympics in 2014 at Sochi, Jansrud won gold in the super-G and bronze in the downhill at Rosa Khutor. At the first World Cup races following the games, he won two speed events at Kvitfjell.

In the 2015 season, Jansrud won seven World Cup races, and placed first in the season standings in both the Super-G and downhill disciplines. He won a silver medal at the World Championships at Beaver Creek in the combined.

Jansrud achieved four wins during the 2016 season. The following year, he won five World Cup races and placed first in super-G, second in downhill, and second in the overall season standing. He also won a silver medal at the World Championships in the super-G.
 
He took the silver medal in the downhill at the Winter Olympics in 2018 in Korea, 0.12 seconds behind teammate and training partner Aksel Lund Svindal, after leading most of the run. He won bronze in the super-G, for his fifth Olympic medal: a gold, two silver, and two bronze.

At the World Championships in 2019 in Sweden, Jansrud won gold in the downhill by two-hundredths of a second, edging out Svindal in his final 

In an interview in November 2021, Jansrud expressed that the coming season probably would be his last season at top level. Jansrud confirmed in February 2022 that the Kvetfjill race on 4 March 2022 will be his last race. He is retiring at the same course on which he won his first race in 2012.

World Cup results

Season titles
4 titles: (1 Downhill, 3 Super-G)

Season standings

Race victories
 23 wins – (8 DH, 13 SG, 1 PGS, 1 SC)
 55 podiums – (19 DH, 26 SG, 6 GS, 2 PGS, 2 SC); 137 top tens

World Championship results

Olympic results

References

External links
  (alpine)
  (cross-country)
 
 
 
 
 Kjetil Jansrud at Head Skis
 Kjetil Jansrud at Norwegian Ski Team 
  

1985 births
Norwegian male alpine skiers
Alpine skiers at the 2006 Winter Olympics
Alpine skiers at the 2010 Winter Olympics
Alpine skiers at the 2014 Winter Olympics
Alpine skiers at the 2018 Winter Olympics
Alpine skiers at the 2022 Winter Olympics
Olympic alpine skiers of Norway
Medalists at the 2010 Winter Olympics
Medalists at the 2014 Winter Olympics
Medalists at the 2018 Winter Olympics
Olympic medalists in alpine skiing
Olympic gold medalists for Norway
Olympic silver medalists for Norway
Olympic bronze medalists for Norway
People from Oppland
Sportspeople from Stavanger
Living people